Jintai Lu is an interchange station between Line 6 and Line 14 of the Beijing Subway.  It is located in Chaoyang District. This station opened on December 30, 2012. It was the western teminus of Line 14 until it was extended westward to Beijing South railway station on December 26, 2015.

Station layout 
Both the line 6 and 14 stations have underground island platforms.

Exits 
There are 6 exits, lettered A, B, C, D, E, and F. Exits C and E are accessible.

References

External links

Beijing Subway stations in Chaoyang District
Railway stations in China opened in 2012